Maksim Krysko (born 28 April 1994) is a Belarusian sprint canoeist.

He won a medal at the 2019 ICF Canoe Sprint World Championships.

References

1994 births
Living people
Belarusian male canoeists
ICF Canoe Sprint World Championships medalists in Canadian